Mahmoud Mukhtar (May 10, 1891 – March 28, 1934)  was an Egyptian sculptor. He attended the College of Fine Arts in Cairo upon its opening in 1908 by Prince Yusuf Kamal, and was part of the original "Pioneers" of the Egyptian Art movement. Despite his early death, he greatly impacted the realization and formation of contemporary Egyptian art. His work is credited with signaling the beginning of the Egyptian modernist movement, and he is often referred to as the father of modern Egyptian sculpture.

History
Born in the Nile Delta in a small village called Douar skouila, in the region of Mahalla al-Kubra, in the village of Tanbara, where his father was the mayor ('Omda). Mukhtar moved to Cairo as a child with his mother, and in 1908 joined the newly founded Egyptian School of Fine Arts.

In 1912, he joined the studio of Jules Coutan at the École des Beaux-Arts in Paris. He stayed in Paris through World War I, eventually becoming employed at the Musée Grévin under the direction of his former teacher Guillaume Laplagne. Inspired by the Egyptian Revolution of 1919 he sculpted a small maquette of a work called "Nadhat Misr" ["Egypt's Awakening" or "Egypt's Renaissance" in English]. Gaining attention of young Egyptian revolutionaries, a national campaign to erect a monumental version was begun, resulting in an unveiling ceremony of the work in Cairo's Bab al-Hadid Square outside Cairo's main train station. The statue was later moved to a location outside Cairo University.

Museum

The Mukhtar Museum in Cairo houses Mahmoud Mokhtar's works in various media.

Legacy
A Google Doodle on 10 May 2012 commemorated Mokhtar's 121st birth anniversary.

References

Dietrich, Linnea S. "Huda Lutfi: A Contemporary Artist in Egypt" Woman's Art Journal. Vol. 21. No. 2. (Autumn 2000–Winter 2001), pp 12–15.

External links 
Al-Ahram Weekly: "Mahmoud Mokhta, Short-changed by history"
Saad Zaghloul Statues mokhtar's meusium at Egyptian fine arts sector  Mahmoud Mokhtar full biography on Egyptian fin arts sector 
Biography of Mahmoud Mukhtar on the Mathaf Encyclopedia of Modern Arab Art and the Arab World

Egyptian sculptors
Artists from Cairo
1891 births
1934 deaths
20th-century sculptors